Andy Zhang (born 14 December 1997) is a Chinese professional golfer who spent much of his childhood in Beijing, China. He first became interested in golf at age six, and began working with a coach at age seven.  At the age of ten, he moved to Bradenton, Florida in the United States to pursue golf.  After professional golfer Paul Casey withdrew from the 2012 U.S. Open due to an injury, Zhang, who became an alternate after performing well in sectional qualifying, was put into the field for the Open, one of the four men's major golf championships. He is the youngest player to ever participate in the U.S. Open at the age of 14. On 6 January 2015, Zhang, a Class of 2016 recruit, verbally committed to play college golf for the University of Florida, picking the Gators over Oklahoma State, Texas and Florida State, among others.

Zhang reached #7 in the World Amateur Golf Ranking before relinquishing his amateur status, turning professional in 2018.

Amateur wins
2014 Thunderbird International Junior
2016 CB&I – Simplify Boys Championship, Azalea Invitational
2018 SEC Championship, NCAA Reunion Regional

Source:

Results in major championships

CUT = missed the half-way cut

Team appearances
Arnold Palmer Cup (representing the International team): 2018

References

External links

Chinese male golfers
Florida Gators men's golfers
Golfers from Florida
Sportspeople from Beijing
Sportspeople from Bradenton, Florida
1997 births
Living people
20th-century Chinese people
21st-century Chinese people